Duppy Gun is a dancehall record label run by Cameron Stallones of Sun Araw and M. Geddes Gengras, based in Los Angeles, California. The label began in Portmore, Jamaica in 2011 after a collaboration between Stallones, Gengras and Jamaican vocal group The Congos on the album Icon Give Thank for RVNG Intl. Duppy Gun releases feature collaborations from American experimental electronic artists and Jamaican singers. Past albums have included production from Peaking Lights, Sun Araw, M. Geddes Gengras, Matthewdavid and vocals by I Jahbar, Lukani, Fyah Flames, G sudden, and Dayone. Since their second release, the 12" vinyl Spy / Up Wit You, the label has been distributed by Los Angeles' Stones Throw Records. The 2014 double LP Duppy Gun Productions Vol 1 featured all of their previous released tracks as well as new music and featured vocalists "from more established roots singers to fisherman to very young neighborhood kids."

Discography
Updated 7 March 2016
Dayone / Early One	Multiply / Earth (12")	DPY001	2011	
Duppy Gun, I Jahbar, Lukani	Spy/Up Wit You (12")	DPPY002	2013	
Fyah Flames, I Jahbar	What Would You Say (12")	DPPY003	2013	
Bookfa / G Sudden	Press Bookfa Press / Girls Dem Need Mi (12")	DPPY004	2013		
Various	Multiply: Duppy Gun Productions, Vol. 1 (2xLP, Comp, Gat)	DPY005	2014	
Various	Multiply: Duppy Gun Productions, Vol. 1 (CD, Comp, Promo)	DPY005	2014	
Genesis Hull	Who Feels It, Knows It (12xFile, MP3, Mixed, 320)		2014

References

External links
Duppy Gun website 
Duppy Gun on Stones Throw Records 
Duppy Gun mix for Dummy Mag 
Duppy Gun Productions on Facebook 

American record labels